Renārs Varslavāns (born 23 August 2001) is a Latvian footballer who plays as an attacker for FK RFS and the Latvia national team.

Career
Varslavāns made his international debut for Latvia on 7 June 2021 against Germany.

References

2001 births
Living people
Latvian footballers
Latvia youth international footballers
Latvia international footballers
Association football forwards
FS METTA/Latvijas Universitāte players
FK RFS players
Latvian Higher League players